"Sunshine" is a song by Australian singer Ricki-Lee Coulter from her self-titled debut album, Ricki-Lee (2005). It was released both physically and digitally on 26 September 2005, as the second single from the album. "Sunshine" peaked at number eight on the Australian ARIA Singles Chart and was certified gold by the Australian Recording Industry Association for shipments of 35,000 copies. The music video for the song was directed by Bart Borghesi.

Background and release
"Sunshine" was written by Kara DioGuardi, Lukas Burton, Zukhan Bey, Norman Johnson, Gregory Perry, Ricki-Lee Coulter and Jarrad Rogers. It was co-produced by Rogers and Burton. In an interview with The Age, Coulter said "Sunshine" is a "happy and in love song" with a motown feel. "Sunshine" contains elements of the 1971 song "Want Ads" by American R&B girl group Honey Cone. Coulter said the sample gives the song "that happy 70s feel".

"Sunshine" was released as a CD single and digital extended play (EP) on 26 September 2005, as the second single from Coulter's self-titled debut album, Ricki-Lee. "Sunshine" debuted on the ARIA Singles Chart at number 14 on 3 October 2005. It peaked at number eight in its fourth week on the chart. "Sunshine" was certified gold by the Australian Recording Industry Association for shipments of 35,000 copies.

Music video
The music video for "Sunshine" was directed by Bart Borghesi and filmed in Melbourne. It features Coulter singing in a house, which is 3D animated, surrounded by animated spotlights.

Track listing
CD single and digital EP
 "Sunshine" – 3:02
 "Gotta Know" – 3:27
 "Sunshine" (instrumental) – 3:02

Credits and personnel
Credits are adapted from the liner notes of Ricki-Lee: The Singles.

Locations
 Mixed at Sing Sing Studios
 Mastered at Crystal Mastering

Personnel
 Songwriting – Kara DioGuardi, Lukas Burton, Zukhan Bey, Norman Johnson, Gregory Perry, Ricki-Lee Coulter, Jarrad Rogers
 Production – Jarrad Rogers, Lukas Burton
 Additional vocals – Kushy
 Mixing – Andy Baldwin
 Mastering – John Ruberto

Charts

Weekly chart

Year-end charts

Certifications

Release history

References

2005 songs
2005 singles
Ricki-Lee Coulter songs
Shock Records singles
Songs written by Kara DioGuardi
Songs written by Jarrad Rogers
Songs written by Lukas Burton
Songs written by Ricki-Lee Coulter